Team 7 is a comic book superhero team that appeared in titles published by Wildstorm Productions. The team has appeared in 3 self-titled miniseries:  Team 7, Team 7: Objective Hell and Team 7: Dead Reckoning. The first 5-issue Gen¹³ limited series also involved members of Team 7. The team's members have played a major role throughout the Wildstorm Universe. In September 2011, The New 52 rebooted DC's continuity, bringing in Wildstorm characters, including Team 7.

Publication history
Team 7 debuted in a self-titled four-issue limited series, published in 1994–95. Writer Brandon Choi remarked on this mini-series that "I really enjoyed [writer] Chuck Dixon's portrayal of the team members, especially Cole. He really wove Cole's background into the whole Team 7 story in a very believable fashion."

The team was featured in the series Wetworks.

A new ongoing series about the group was announced by DC in June 2012. It began with a "#0" issue in November, and ended with a "#8" issue in July 2013. The series was written by Justin Jordan and illustrated by an assortment of artists. Set five years in the past during the emergence of superheroes, the group's membership consists of a combination of DCU and Wildstorm characters: Dinah Drake, Amanda Waller, Kurt Lance, Summer Ramos, James Bronson, Dean Higgins, John Lynch, Alex Fairchild, Cole Cash, and Slade Wilson.

Fictional biography
Team 7 was officially the seventh incarnation of a group of military specialists gathered from various government forces (a Team Zero was later revealed, making Team 7 the group's eighth incarnation).

Team 7 took its orders from Miles Craven, director of International Operations. Craven wanted his own army of superhumans, and therefore dropped a chemical known as the "Gen-factor" on the members of Team 7 during a (suicide) mission. When they awoke from their Gen-factor induced comas, Team 7 was told that the enemy had dropped a chemical weapon on them. As a result of the Gen-factor, Team 7 (except for Michael Cray) started to develop superhuman powers. It would be years before Cray himself would develop similar abilities. Team 7 member Cole Cash distrusted Craven and suspected that he was behind the experiment. Several members of Team 7 were unable to cope with their new powers and went mad or committed suicide. At least one had to be shot during a subsequent mission. As a test, Craven dropped a "low-yield nuke" on Team 7. The members survived through co-operation and went into hiding.

Sometime later, Team 7 returned to work for I.O. and were sent to destroy a cache of nuclear weapons from Cambodia before the Khmer Rouge could get them. The team succeeded, but learned that a pair of Soviet superhumans were trailing them. They battled them, but they turned out to be too strong and Jackson Dane went into a coma. The Cambodian blind girl X'ing X'iang, who had displayed superhuman mental powers before, overpowered one of the Soviet agents, while Michael Cray shot the other one. The team returned to the U.S. and took X'ing X'iang with them.

Years later, the Team 7 members were ordered to bring in the Soviet scientist, Dbovchek. Cole Cash entered the Soviet Union on his own to find out more about Dbovchek while the rest of the team went on the mission. Dbovchek turned out to be one of the main scientists behind the Russian psionic program. The mission turned out to be a failure; Dbovchek was killed and Cash was captured. Cash discovers that his mental powers were waning, but John Lynch saved him.

Back in the U.S., Jackson Dane awoke from his coma under the influence of International Operations. Dane's powers turned out to be far stronger than the rest of Team 7 combined, but Cray brought in X'ing X'iang who freed Dane. She found out through Dane that Miles Craven had become interested in the children of Team 7, so most Team 7 members took their families and went into hiding. This would turn out to be the end of Team 7, though most members would stay in contact and occasionally reunite.

Jackson Dane would lead a new Team 7 years later.

DC Universe
After the events of the Flashpoint limited series, the Wildstorm universe was assimilated into the DC Universe as seen in 2011's launch of The New 52. In this timeline, Team 7 was assembled by John Lynch, to prevent future metahuman threats. Members like Black Canary, Deathstroke, and Grifter gained their superpowers while working in the team. The team was disbanded after a mission retrieving Pandora's Box.

Membership of Team 7

Last Wildstorm incarnation
 John Lynch Code-named Topkick, team leader Lynch was the former head of I.O.'s Black Razors. He starred in Gen¹³ and Sleeper. Father of Burnout of Gen¹³.  His Team 7 identification mark was a circle with a stripe upwards painted over his left eye.

 Marc Slayton Code-named Backlash, Slayton was a member of Team Zero, Team One, Team 7, and Stormwatch, as well as his own Wildcore. He starred in Wildstorm's Stormwatch, Backlash, and Wildcore.  Father of Jet (formerly Crimson of Wildcore) and Aries.  His Team 7 identification mark was a trapezoid, pointed downwards painted over his left eye.

 Cole Cash Code-named Dead Eye (though later taking on the code name Grifter), Cash has been a figurehead of the Wildstorm Universe, being an expert with a gun, holding Coda training, and having psi powers. Grifter has starred in many Wildstorm comics such as WildC.A.T.S., Sleeper, Point Blank, and two of his own solo titles. Youngest member of the team, being only in his mid-20s. Thanks to exposure to the Gen-factor, he hasn't physically aged since. His Team 7 identification mark was the same symbol as later appeared on his mask. The mark was over his left eye.

 Michael Cray Code-named Deathblow, starred in his own self-titled series.  Died during the Fire from Heaven event but has since returned (twice), although the reason remains a mystery. The father of Sublime of DV8. He was the only team member not to initially develop psionic powers as a result of exposure to the Gen-factor, though some eventually manifested many years later. Several 'clones' of him were created as well, one 'clone' being female and African-American, among others.  His Team 7 identification mark were two parallel strips over his left and right eye, going from his hairline to his chin.

 Jackson Dane Code-named Arclight, Dane starred in the comic Wetworks, which was about a new incarnation of Team 7.  His Team 7 identification mark was a lightning bolt over his left eye.

 Christie Blaze Originally chosen by Lynch to round out the first incarnation of Team 7, she was kept out of the team by I/O Director Miles Craven, who knew the only reason Lynch had chosen her was because they were lovers.  Lynch recruited her for the reconstituted Team 7 post-World's End.

Former members
 Philip Chang Code-named Bulleteer. Current location unknown. Father of Grunge of Gen¹³. His Team 7 identification mark was a waxing crescent moon over his right eye.

 Stephen Callahan Code-named Wraparound. Faked his death, only to be revealed alive years later. Father of Threshold and Bliss of DV8 as well as Sarah Rainmaker of Gen¹³. His Team 7 identification mark was a cross over his left eye. The team's only Marine, one of the primary reasons for his agreeing to join was that he wanted his service branch to be represented.

 Alex Fairchild Code-named Slaphammer. Died in the pages of Gen¹³. Father of Caitlin Fairchild and Freefall of Gen¹³. His Team 7 identification mark was an Ace of Spades over his left eye.

Other members
 Berckmann, first name unknown Died from the side effects of Gen-factor exposure.

 Robert Diaz Was abandoned on a mission and joined the Kindred. Nicknamed Bloodmoon.

 Andrew Johnson Shot by Cole Cash for abusing his powers in sadistic ways.

 Richard MacNamara Code-named Boloround. Committed suicide after exposure to the Gen-factor.

 Lucius Morgan Currently known as the Pirate King. Exact circumstances of his time with Team 7 are unknown, but he was not a member when the team was exposed to the Gen-Factor.

 Jack Rhodes Nicknamed Cyberjack, Rhodes was severely wounded and left the team before Team 7's exposure to the Gen-factor.

New 52 incarnation
 Amanda Waller
 Alex Fairchild
 James Bronson
 Cole Cash
 Dinah Drake 
 John Lynch 
 Kurt Lance 
 Summer Ramos 
 Dean Higgins 
 Slade Wilson
 Steve Trevor

Other versions

Flashpoint
An alternate version of Team 7, now led by Grifter, appeared in the Flashpoint universe. This version consisted mainly of superheroes who had ties to the military in the DC Universe, but here were simply shown to be regular soldiers, albeit with outfits that resembled their superhero costumes. Most of the team were killed during a battle against a terrorist camp, though Grifter was saved by Penny Black. This led to Grifter leaving the military and ultimately becoming the leader of the Resistance, a rebel group formed to oppose the Amazons after they invaded the U.K.

Its members are:

 John Stewart A former Marine turned member of the Green Lantern Corps in the main DC continuity.
 Kate Kane A former West Point cadet who had been expelled from the academy after it was discovered that she was in a lesbian relationship with a fellow student. She eventually became the vigilante Batwoman.
 David Reid An ex-soldier and descendant of Franklin Delano Roosevelt who joined the Justice Society of America before becoming the superhero Magog.
 Sgt. Rock Leader of the famed Easy Company during World War II in the main DC Universe.
 Zinda Blake Ace pilot and member of both the Blackhawks and the Birds of Prey in the main DC Universe.
 Gunner Member of the Losers, another famed World War II unit in the main timeline.

In other media

Film
 Some members of Team 7 are seen in the animated film Gen¹³'''.

Television
 In the CW show Arrow, a television show based on Green Arrow, Team 7 is mentioned in the episode "Betrayal" as an ASIS unit. So far the only members are Slade Wilson and Billy Wintergreen. Amanda Waller, Detective Lance and Dinah Drake have also appeared in the show but not as members of the team.

Video games
 Team 7 is referenced in Batman: Arkham Knight. According to a conversation between the Militia, they disappeared without a trace and nobody knows what happened to them. The Militia said that they've heard the name from the Birds of Prey.

Related titles

Titles starring Team 7:Team 7 series 1Team 7: Objective HellTeam 7/Team X (intercompany crossover with Marvel Comics)Team 7: Dead ReckoningGen 12The KindredWildstorm Rising (Team 7: Objective Hell #1 was the prologue and various of former members appeared in this crossover)Fire From Heaven series

Solo-titles starring former Team 7-members:BacklashDeathblowGrifterTitles starring related teams:DV8, featuring the children of Team 7-members.Gen¹³, featuring the children of Team 7-members, John Lynch and Alex Fairchild.Point Blank, featuring Cole Cash, John Lynch and Marc SlaytonSleeper, featuring John Lynch, Cole Cash and Marc Slayton.Stormwatch, initially featuring Marc Slayton.Team One, precursor to Team 7, featuring Marc Slayton.Team Zero, precursor to Team 7, featuring Marc Slayton.Wetworks, successor to Team 7, featuring Jackson Dane.Wildcore, featuring Marc Slayton.WildC.A.T.S.'', featuring Cole Cash.

References

1994 comics debuts
DC Comics superhero teams
WildStorm superhero teams
WildStorm limited series
DC Comics titles